Cissia is a genus of satyrid butterfly found in the Neotropical realm.

Species
Listed alphabetically:
Cissia cleophes (Godman & Salvin, 1889) – Salvin's satyr
Cissia confusa (Staudinger, 1887) – confused satyr
Cissia joyceae Singer, DeVries & Ehrlich, 1983
Cissia labe (Butler, 1870)  – rusty-spotted satyr
Cissia lesbia (Staudinger, [1886]) – Lesbia satyr
Cissia maripa Brévignon, 2005
Cissia moneta (Weymer, 1911)
Cissia myncea (Cramer, 1780) – Myneca satyr
Cissia palladia (Butler, 1867) – Butler's satyr
Cissia penelope (Fabricius, 1775) – Penelope's ringlet
Cissia pompilia (C. & R. Felder, [1867]) – plain satyr
Cissia proba (Weymer, 1911) – Weymer's ringlet
Cissia pseudoconfusa Singer, DeVries & Ehrlich, 1983 – gold-stained satyr
Cissia similis (Butler, 1867) – stormy satyr
Cissia terrestris (Butler, 1867) – terrestrial satyr, Butler's ringlet
Cissia themis (Butler, 1867) – Nicaraguan satyr

References

Euptychiina
Nymphalidae of South America
Butterflies of Trinidad and Tobago
Butterfly genera